Nico Zimmermann (born 2 September 1985) is a German footballer who plays as a midfielder for SV Röchling Völklingen.

Career

Zimmermann came through 1. FC Saarbrücken youth system, having previously played for 1. FC Kaiserslautern, and progressed to the first team, making his debut in the 2. Bundesliga, in the last game of the 2005–06 season against Eintracht Braunschweig as a substitute for Arif Karaoglan. Saarbrücken had been relegated to the Regionalliga, but Zimmermann didn't make another first-team appearance, so left the club in January 2007, joining SV Elversberg. After two and a half years with Elversberg, he returned to FCS in 2009. The club won the Regionalliga West in his first season back, and after helping the club achieve a respectable finish in the 3. Liga, he joined Eintracht Braunschweig in July 2011. After a year with Braunschweig, he signed for VfR Aalen. Six months later, he joined Hansa Rostock on a half-season loan. In August 2013 he returned to SV Elversberg, who had just been promoted to the 3. Liga

References

External links
 
 Nico Zimmermann at Fupa

1985 births
Living people
People from Zweibrücken
German footballers
1. FC Saarbrücken players
SV Elversberg players
Eintracht Braunschweig players
VfR Aalen players
FC Hansa Rostock players
SV Röchling Völklingen players
Association football midfielders
2. Bundesliga players
3. Liga players
Footballers from Rhineland-Palatinate